Leslie Charles "Les" Lewis (26 December 1924 – 7 April 1986) was a British track and field athlete who competed in the 1948 Summer Olympics and in the 1952 Summer Olympics. He was born in Chertsey, Surrey.

Lewis was part of the winning British 4×400 metres relay team at the 1950 European Athletics Championships. In the 1950 British Empire Games in Auckland, New Zealand he won two silver medals in relays and an individual silver medal in the 440yards.

He later migrated over from England to New Zealand and became a geography and PE teacher.

Competition record

References

1924 births
1986 deaths
British male sprinters
English male sprinters
Olympic athletes of Great Britain
Athletes (track and field) at the 1948 Summer Olympics
Athletes (track and field) at the 1952 Summer Olympics
European Athletics Championships medalists
Sportspeople from Chertsey
Athletes (track and field) at the 1950 British Empire Games
Commonwealth Games medallists in athletics
Commonwealth Games silver medallists for England
20th-century British people
Medallists at the 1950 British Empire Games